Edward Chattaway (1873 – 2 May 1956) was an English journalist and editor of The Star from 1930 to 1936.

Early life
Chattaway was born in Leamington Spa in 1873 the son of William Clarke Chattaway, he was educated at the Warwick School. He started as a journalist on the Warwick Advertiser and then the King's Lynn News, he gained more experience at the Birmingham Argus.

The Star
In 1899 Chattaway moved to London with a job on The Star where he soon gained a reputation as a court reporter. He was soon reporting on high-profile cases such as the Moat Farm murder and the trial of Crippen. He was soon promoted in the paper until 1930 when he became the editor. He resigned in 1936 and became editorial director on the board of The Star and the News Chronicle for the next ten years.

Family life
Chattaway married in 1910 to Edith May de Hane. On 2 May 1956 he died in his home in London.

References

1873 births
1956 deaths
British newspaper editors
English male journalists
People educated at Warwick School
People from Leamington Spa